Founded in 1981, the Inter American University of Puerto Rico, School of Optometry (IAUPR)  offers a four-year Doctor of Optometry program and is located in Bayamón, Puerto Rico.  In 1992, the School of Optometry became a separate autonomous academic unit within the Inter American University of Puerto Rico  system.  The School of Optometry is accredited by the Council on Higher Education of Puerto Rico, the Middle States Commission on Higher Education, and the Accreditation Council on Optometric Education (ACOE) of the American Optometric Association for the maximum term of eight years.

References

External links
 
Official site

Interamerican University of Puerto Rico
Optometry schools
Optometry schools in the United States